L. Helen Rankin (born September 12, 1936) is a former member of the Ohio House of Representatives. She was the first African-American woman to serve in the Ohio House of Representatives.

In February 2013, Rankin was recognized by the Cincinnati City Council as a prominent local African American.

External links
Profile on the Ohio Ladies' Gallery website

References

1936 births
African-American state legislators in Ohio
African-American women in politics
Living people
Democratic Party members of the Ohio House of Representatives
Women state legislators in Ohio
21st-century African-American people
21st-century African-American women
20th-century African-American people
20th-century African-American women